Armillaria novae-zelandiae is a species of mushroom-forming fungus in the family Physalacriaceae. This plant pathogen species is one of three Armillaria species that have been identified in New Zealand (the others are A. limonea and A. hinnulea).

Hosts and symptoms
Fungi in the genus Armillaria have a wide host range and can cause disease on a variety of tree species throughout New Zealand; particularly in plantations, home gardens, and parks. According to Hood (1989) the fungus has also been reported in Chile, Argentina, and Australia. There have also been reported epidemics of kiwifruit orchards. Armillaria novae-zelandiae occurs in indigenous forests as a decay fungus of dead trees, stumps, and logs. It causes butt rots in living trees as well. Plants at both the seedling and adult stages are susceptible. Infection happens on the roots of the host plant. The hyphae, mycelium, and rhizomorphs of A. novae-zelandiae can survive on infected tissues in soil for a long time, and in spring when plants start growing, the pathogen can infect new growing tissue.

Huang (2016) describes that early symptoms of this pathogen include yellowish-brown water-soaked lesions on the cortex of the host plant at the root collar. The cortex rots gradually and the phloem tissues begin to flake off and the xylem rots. There is chlorosis of the leaves as well. As the disease progresses, more visible signs of the pathogen become apparent as the mycelium invades the infected tissues. Clusters of the honey-yellow umbrella-shaped sporocarps, also known as mushrooms, form on the rotten roots. This can result in dieback and even death.

Environment 
A. novae-zelandiae grows most abundantly from March to May. It grows in wet forests primarily. The pathogen can be spread through farming practices, underground pests, or by any other means of moving around infected soil such as on shoes and boots. The spread of infection is accelerated by high levels of moisture in the soil such as those caused by rainy seasons as well as excessive irrigation in agricultural fields, and also persists when temperatures are fairly warm. A. novae-zelandiae has been shown to survive temperatures up to 41 °C. Recent studies have shown that in forests in Spain, Armillaria does not persist as well in places where the average rainfall is less than 1000 mm. Studies have also shown that in pine forests, as pine root systems increase in size and overlap, there is a possibility of disease transfer which allows the spread of infection beyond the area of the original primary source. Also, trees that have been weakened by stresses like defoliation by insects or frost, drought, waterlogging, soil compaction, air pollution, and foliage diseases. The rhizomorphs of the fungus colonize the weakened trees and can colonize an entire root system after severe stresses.

Management 
As discussed in an article by the company Scion of New Zealand analyzing control methods of A. novae-zelandiae, a costly but effective method of controlling disease caused by this pathogen has consisted of removing stumps before planting the next crop in an area. This is because the pathogen colonizes and persists on stumps and then attacks healthy trees once they are planted. Removal of old stumps helps remove the inoculum source. As of 2015, research is being done to see if biological control is another option, by increasing the incidence of other fungi which naturally colonize pine stumps and compete with Armillaria for the substrate, thus forcing the Armillaria species to be confined to smaller and more insignificant segments of the stump. Other methods for reducing disease incidence can be planting vigorous healthy stock and treating for Dothistroma needle blight, which is a common needle disease that affects many pine tree species.

See also
 List of Armillaria species

References

novae-zelandiae
Fungi described in 1964
Fungi of New Zealand
Fungal tree pathogens and diseases
Taxa named by Greta Stevenson